Archibald Stuart Duncan (February 5, 1887 – after 1943) was a doctor and politician in Ontario, Canada. He represented London in the Legislative Assembly of Ontario from 1934 to 1943 as a Liberal.

The son of George Duncan and Christina Campbell, he was born in Dutton and was educated in London and at the University of Western Ontario.

References

External links

1887 births
Year of death missing
Ontario Liberal Party MPPs